The discography of American singer Juice Newton consists of 17 studio albums, one live album, 10 compilation albums, 39 singles, one video album, nine music videos, five guest appearances on all-star tribute albums, and dramatic readings in two audiobook anthologies.

Studio albums

Juice Newton & Silver Spur

Juice Newton

1970s and 1980s

1990s 2010s

Compilation albums

Live album

Singles

Juice Newton & Silver Spur

Juice Newton

Tribute album appearances

Videos

Video album

Music videos

Audiobooks

Backing or harmony vocalist

Notes
A^ "Angel of the Morning" also peaked at number 57 on the U.S. Hot Mainstream Rock Tracks chart and number 43 on the UK Singles Chart.
B^ "Both to Each Other (Friends and Lovers)" is only available on the 1986 re-issue of Old Flame.

References

Country music discographies
Discographies of American artists